Leopoldo Menéndez López (30 April 1891 – 1965) was a Spanish military officer. Before the war, he was an adviser of the prime minister Manuel Azaña. A professional officer of the Spanish Army, he supported the Republican government during the Spanish Civil War. Later he was promoted to Colonel and in the Battle of Teruel, he led the XXth Army Corps. In 1938, he led the Army of Levante in the battle of the XYZ Line. In August 1938 he was promoted to General. On February 16, 1939, he was one of the officers who said to the prime minister Juan Negrin that was impossible to continue the resistance and in March 1939 he supported Casado's coup. At the end of the war, he fled Spain to France and later he went to exiled in Mexico and died there.

References

1891 births
1965 deaths
People from Arratia-Nerbioi
Spanish generals
Spanish military personnel of the Spanish Civil War (Republican faction)
Exiles of the Spanish Civil War in France
Exiles of the Spanish Civil War in Mexico